Exercises in Futility is the third studio album by Polish black metal band Mgła. It was released on 4 September 2015, through Northern Heritage Records. Featuring "a raw, melodic black metal" style that was compared to those of Watain and early Burzum, the album is regarded as "the biggest and most impactful release of the band's 15-year career." The front cover features an artwork from French engraver Marcel Roux, titled L'aveugle ("The blind", 1908).

The band embarked a North American tour following the album's release.

Critical reception

Exercises in Futility was met with positive responses. Andy O'Connor of Pitchfork praised the album, stating, "Mgła are the true heirs to Dissection's style of black metal; the melodies are huge without dipping into the saccharine." O'Connor further stated: "Mgła's accomplished performance on Futility transforms the lyrical content into a call to action."

Exercise in Futility was listed as number 8 on Pitchfork's "The Best Metal Albums of 2015" list.

Track listing
 "Exercises in Futility I" – 7:58
 "Exercises in Futility II" – 7:48
 "Exercises in Futility III" – 4:37
 "Exercises in Futility IV" – 4:45
 "Exercises in Futility V" – 8:15
 "Exercises in Futility VI" – 8:49

Personnel
 Mikołaj "M." Żentara – guitar, bass, vocals, recording
 Maciej "Darkside" Kowalski – drums, recording

References

External links
 Exercises in Futility on Bandcamp

2015 albums
Mgła albums